Iranian studies, also referred to as Iranology and Iranistics, is an interdisciplinary field dealing with the research and study of the civilization, history, literature, art and culture of Iranian peoples. It is a part of the wider field of Oriental studies. 

Iranian studies is broader than and distinct from Persian studies, which is the study of the modern Persian language and literature specifically. The discipline of Iranian Studies focuses on broad trends in culture, history, language and other aspects of not only Persians, but also a variety of other contemporary and historical Iranian peoples, such as Kurds, Lurs, Gilakis, Talysh, Tajiks, Pashtuns, Ossetians, Baluchis, Scythians, Sarmatians, Alans, Parthians, Sogdians, Bactrians, Khwarazmians, and Mazandaranis.

In medieval Iran 

In this sense Ferdowsi's nationalistic approach can be contrasted with that of Muhammad ibn Jarir al-Tabari, the famous ninth-century Iranian historian whose History of the Prophets and Kings reflects a more specifically Islamic perspective. Ferdowsi's work follows earlier semi-historical works such as the lost Sasanian-era Khwaday-Namag.

Persian historiography strictly speaking begins with the Tarikh-i Mas'udi of Abulfazl Bayhaqi (995-1077), whose fluent prose style was highly influential on subsequent Persian literature. Persian historical writing reached its peak two centuries later with the Jami al-Tawarikh of Rashīd al-Dīn Fadhl-allāh Hamadānī (1247–1318). Other important historical works include the Tarikh-i Jahangushay by Ata-Malik Juvayni and the Zafarnamah of Sharaf ad-Din Ali Yazdi, a history of the Turco-Mongolian conqueror Timur (Tamerlane; 1370–1405).

In modern Iran 

Among the most prominent scholars of Iranian Studies in Iran during the twentieth century may be counted Badiozzaman Forouzanfar, Abdolhossein Zarrinkoub, Zabihollah Safa, Mojtaba Minovi, Mohsen Abolqasemi, Ahmad Tafazzoli, Alireza Shapour Shahbazi, and Fereydoon Joneydi. The Loghat-nameh by Ali-Akbar Dehkhoda is the largest comprehensive Persian dictionary ever published, in 15 volumes (26,000 pages).

In Europe

Germany 
Germany historically has one of the more prolific places for research and writings about Iran, outside of Iran itself. Iranian studies (German: Iranistik) in German-speaking countries goes as far back as 1654 AD and the publication of Golestan Saadi with translation by Adam Olearius. Classical Iranology in German began in the early nineteenth century with the research and writings of Georg Friedrich Grotefend. 

Iran studies programs in Germany are at Freie Universität Berlin and the Georg-August-Universität Göttingen.

France 
The emergence of comparative Indo-European linguistics and the translation of the Avesta happened in the late eighteenth century, by French scholar Abraham Hyacinthe Anquetil-Duperron.

Iranian studies programs in France are at Sorbonne Nouvelle University Paris 3, and the French National Centre for Scientific Research.

Sweden 
However a Swedish gold coin from 1700s was found in an Iranian bazaar, which may indicate earlier contact between the cultures. Early Swedish scholars of Iranian studies included Nathan Söderblom (1866–1931), Henrik Samuel Nyberg (1889–1974), Geo Widengren (1907–1996), Stig Wikander (1908–1984), Sven Hartman (1917–1988), and Bo Utas (b. 1938).

United Kingdom 
A major European scholarly organization devoted to Iranian Studies is the Societas Iranologica Europaea, founded in 1981. The Iran Heritage Foundation was founded in 1995 and is based in London, they support Iranian studies at several universities and sponsors a wide range of public cultural events.

Other Iran studies programs in the United Kingdom are at the University of Cambridge, the British Institute of Persian Studies (BIPS), Durham University, University of Oxford, University of St Andrews, University of London, and the Library for Iranian Studies.

Other 
There are Iran studies programs in the Austrian Academy of Sciences, Austria; Jagiellonian University, and Warsaw University in Poland; the University of Salamanca in Spain; and the Scandinavian Society for Iranian Studies (SSIS) at various locations in Scandinavian.

In North America

United States

Columbia University 
A. V. Williams Jackson was an early American scholar on Indo-European languages and worked as a Columbia University professor. Jackson was known for producing a grammar of the Avestan language. The monumental Encyclopedia Iranica project was started in 1985 and led by retired Columbia University professor, Ehsan Yarshater.

Harvard University 
Richard N. Frye developed Iranian studies program in the 1950s at Harvard University in Cambridge, Massachusetts.

University of California, Los Angeles 
An Iranian studies program was created at the University of California, Los Angeles (UCLA) in 1963 in the Department of Near Eastern Languages and Cultures (NELC) that was established by Wolf Leslau a few years before, in 1959. The doctoral program at UCLA is the largest program in North America, and was the home institution of Professor emeritus Hanns-Peter Schmidt who used to read Old Iranian and Old Indic (Indo-Iranistik), and is now led by M. Rahim Shayegan who also specializes in Ancient Iran.

In 2021, UCLA hosted an Indo-Persian Musical Confluence gathering, which spanned several days and was focused on the history between the sitar and setar instruments.

Other schools 
During the Iranian Revolution (1978–1979) the American academic centers in Iran were closed and their assets seized. Over the past three decades since then, lack of funding and the difficulty of research travel to Iran have been major obstacles to Iranian Studies scholars that are based in North America.

Other universities in the United States where Iranian Studies classes are offered include the University of Chicago; Princeton University; Stanford University; Massachusetts Institute of Technology; the University of Arizona; the University of Oklahoma; the University of Maryland; the University of Michigan, Ann Arbor; Ohio State University; Quinnipiac University; University of Texas at Austin; University of Virginia; University of Washington; and Indiana University, Bloomington. Within the University of California system, programs in Iran Studies are taught at the University of California, Los Angeles, University of California, Irvine, and San Francisco State University. 

The International Society for Iranian Studies (previously known as the Society for Iranian Studies) was founded by a group of Iranian graduate students in 1967 and began producing a journal, Iranian Studies. The field expanded considerably during the 1970s, with a number of Americans having served in the Peace Corps in Iran taking up academic positions. Close relations between Iran and the US facilitated the growth of academic programs as well as the Asia Institute in Shiraz and the American Institute of Iranian Studies.

Canada 
The University of Toronto has an Iranian studies program. The Yarshater Lectureship in Avestan and Pahlavi Languages established at the University of Toronto is one of the most prestigious honor in the field.

In 2021, the University of Toronto partnered with the Encyclopaedia Iranica Foundation for a multiyear partnership to create the Iranian Women Poets and Iranian Cinema digital projects.

Organizations 
The American Institute of Iranian Studies (AIIrS) is a nonprofit founded in 1967, formed to promoted Iranian and Persian studies in American educational institutions. The Foundation for Iranian Studies is a nonprofit founded in 1981 in Bethesda, Maryland, and since 1982 they host an oral history program. The Ilex Foundation is a nonprofit organization founded in 1999 in Boston, Massachusetts, formed to study Mediterranean and Near Eastern civilizations. 

The Iran Heritage Foundation (IHF) is a nonprofit founded in 1995 by Ali Ansari in the United Kingdom; and the parallel organization the Iran Heritage Foundation America is a nonprofit founded in 2010 in New York.

The Societas Iranologica Europaea (SIE) was founded in 1983 in Rome, with members from European and non-European countries. SIE works to promote and support Persian and Iranian philology, linguistics, literature, history, religions, art, archaeology, philosophy, ethnology, geography, human sciences, and jurisprudence.

Notable scholars

Book series 

 Iranian Studies (LIT Verlag)
 The Anthropology of Persianate Societies

Journals and magazines

See also

References

External links 
 Scandinavian Society for Iranian Studies
 short courses in Iranology by Faculty of World Studies of Tehran university 
 International Society for Iranian Studies
 Bonyad e farhang e Iran
Encyclopædia Pahlavica

Library guides 
 
 
 

 
Studies
Middle Eastern studies
Central Asian studies
Indo-European studies